Ray Chan or Raymond Chan may refer to:

 Raymond Chan (born 1951), Canadian politician
 Raymond Chan Chi-chuen (born 1972), Hong Kong politician, first openly gay member of the Legislative Council of Hong Kong
 Ray Chan (businessman) (born 1984), co-founder of 9GAG
 Ray Chan (academic), Australian oncology nurse

See also
 Raymond Chang (disambiguation)
 Ray Chen (disambiguation)